Michel Caux (born 30 August 1946) is a French ice hockey player. He competed in the men's tournament at the 1968 Winter Olympics.

References

1946 births
Living people
Olympic ice hockey players of France
Ice hockey players at the 1968 Winter Olympics
People from Chamonix
Sportspeople from Haute-Savoie